Malhação (Young Hearts in English) is a Brazilian soap-opera that aired on TV Globo from 4 March 1995 to 3 April 2020. The series is targeted at a teenage audience. Each season runs for about a year with cast members changing every season.

History 
The soap opera began in 1995, and was initially set in a fictional Gym Club called Malhação on Barra da Tijuca, Rio de Janeiro. Through the years the setting varied each season. Although the name of the soap remained the same, it was set in the Múltipla Escolha High School for nine seasons. In the twenty-second season, the location returned to be a gym, the Gael's Martial Arts Gym, placed within the art school Ribalta. The following season brought the high school setting back. From the twenty-fourth season onwards, the setting was changed back to the "Academia Form".

During the first fourteen seasons, each episode of Malhação began with a cold open scene, preceded by a recap of the previous episodes, continuing the narrative that follows. This technique was removed at the beginning of the fifteenth season.

The series has been broadcast in several countries by Globo Internacional, including SIC (between 1995 and 2007, airing with the name "New Wave") in Portugal and by ABC Spark in Canada.

Cancellation 
The series was cancelled after 27 seasons on 28 September 2021. The final season, Malhação: Toda Forma de Amar, finished with 253 episodes, a reduction from the planned 288 episodes that was forced by the COVID-19 pandemic. The series had been renewed for a twenty-eighth season titled Malhação: Transformação, written by Márcia Prates and Priscila Steinman, which also had its production suspended by the COVID-19 pandemic and postponed to 2021. Transformação was eventually scrapped and replaced by Malhação: Eu Quero é Ser Feliz written by Eduardo and Marcos Carvalho, until the series was cancelled altogether.

Plot 
Malhação revolves around the everyday life of teenagers, their conflicts, including school, friends, families, and especially their relationships, which occupy the central focus of all the seasons. Every season, a different couple of protagonists occupies the core of the whole storyline.

Cast 

Similar to American soap operas and long-running television series, cast and characters change each season, but actors who have stayed for more than one season include Gustavo Goulart, Alexandre Slaviero, and Sérgio Hondjakoff.

Series overview

Theme songs
Malhação has had 17 different theme songs:

Notes

References

External links 
 

Brazilian telenovelas
TV Globo telenovelas
1995 telenovelas
1995 Brazilian television series debuts
2020 Brazilian television series endings
Portuguese-language telenovelas